Qaleh Gah (also Romanized as Qal‘eh Gāh) is a village in Mansur-e Aqai Rural District, Shahu District, Ravansar County, Kermanshah Province, Iran. At the 2006 census, its population was 217, in 43 families.

References 

Populated places in Ravansar County